This is a list of light novel labels i.e. Japanese publishing imprints that release light novels.

Bunkobon
B's LOG Bunko – affiliated with Enterbrain
Dengeki Bunko – affiliated with ASCII Media Works
Famitsu Bunko – affiliated with Enterbrain
Fujimi Fantasia Bunko – affiliated with Fujimi Shobo
GA Bunko – affiliated with SB Creative
Gagaga Bunko – affiliated with Shogakukan
HJ Bunko – affiliated with Hobby Japan
Kadokawa Sneaker Bunko, Kadokawa Beans Bunko – affiliated with Kadokawa Shoten
Kodansha Ranobe Bunko - affiliated with Kodansha
Kono Light Novel ga Sugoi! Bunko – affiliated with Takarajimasha
LINE Bunko Edge - LINE
Media Works Bunko – affiliated with ASCII Media Works
Megami Bunko – affiliated with Gakken
MF Bunko J – affiliated with Media Factory
Nagomi Bunko – affiliated with Harvest Shuppan
Sohgeisha Clear Bunko – affiliated with Sohgeisha
Super Dash Bunko, Cobalt Bunko and JUMP j-BOOKS – affiliated with Shueisha
VA Bunko – affiliated with Visual Art's

Tankōbon
Dengeki no Shin Bungei – affiliated with ASCII Media Works
GA Novel – affiliated with SB Creative
GC Novels - affiliated with Micro Magazine
HJ Novels – affiliated with Hobby Japan 
Kadokawa Books – affiliated with Fujimi Shobo
MF Books – affiliated with Media Factory
TO Books - affiliated with T.O Entertainment

References

See also
List of light novels

Light novels-related lists
Literature lists